Janet Wentz (née Neff, July 21, 1937 – September 15, 2003) was the speaker of the North Dakota House of Representatives from January 7, 2003 until her death. She was elected in December 2002 to serve from January 2003 and was the second woman to become speaker of the North Dakota legislature. Representative Matthew Klein succeeded her as speaker.

Early life 
She was born Janet Marie Neff on July 21, 1937, to her parents, Charles and Martha Neff, in McCulsky, North Dakota. She attended McClusky High School and graduated in 1955. Wentz went on to study at Westmar College, in Le Mars, Iowa, the University of Minnesota, in Minneapolis, and Minot State University in North Dakota. She married Thomas Wentz in 1957.

Career 
Wentz first won election to the North Dakota House of Representatives in 1974. In her time at the legislature, she served as Chair of the House Judiciary Committee.

In December 2002, she became Speaker of the North Dakota House of Representatives. She remained speaker until she died in office, on September 15, 2003.

See also 

 List of female speakers of legislatures in the United States

References

External links 
North Dakota Legislature biography page

Women state legislators in North Dakota
Republican Party members of the North Dakota House of Representatives
Speakers of the North Dakota House of Representatives
1937 births
21st-century American politicians
2003 deaths
Westmar University alumni
University of Minnesota alumni
Minot State University alumni
21st-century American women politicians
20th-century American politicians
20th-century American women politicians